Heritage studies looks at the relationship between people and tangible and intangible heritage through the use of social science research methods. The publication of the book by David Lowenthal, The Past is a Foreign Country, in 1985 is credited with creating the field (Carman & Sørensen 2009). While related to the disciplines of history, heritage conservation, and historic preservation, heritage studies is not necessarily concerned with the objective representation of the past. History is "the raw facts of the past" (Aitchison, MacLeod, & Shaw 2000, p. 96) while heritage is "history processed through mythology, ideology, nationalism, local pride, romantic ideas or just plain marketing" (Schouten 1995, p. 21). The meanings of heritage are therefore subjective and rooted in the present; these meanings are defined by social, cultural, and individual processes. In other words, the meanings of heritage can be understood through contemporary sociocultural and experiential values. Lowenthal (1985, p. 410) argues that in the realm of human experience, we create heritage; to most people, heritage is therefore more important than history and is a product of human invention and creativity.

See also
 Heritage science

Bibliography 

 Aitchison, C.,MacLeod, N.E., Shaw, S.J. (2000). Leisure and tourism landscapes: Social and cultural geographies. London: Routledge.
 Carman, J., & Sørensen, M. L. S. (2009). Heritage studies: An outline. In M. L. S. Sørensen & J. Carman (Eds.), Heritage studies: Methods and approaches (pp. 11–28). Routledge.
 Lowenthal, D. (1985). The past is a foreign country. Cambridge, UK: Cambridge University Press.
 Schouten, F.F.J. (1995). Heritage as historical reality. In D. T. Herbert (ed.), Heritage, tourism and society. London: Mansell.

External links 
 Conserving the Human Environment
 Association of Critical Heritage Studies
 International Journal of Heritage Studies

Cultural heritage
Cultural studies